Santana N. Dotson (born December 19, 1969) is a former American football defensive tackle in the National Football League. He was a part of Houston's Yates High School football team when it won the 1985 5A state championship. While at Baylor, Dotson was voted All-American in 1991. He won the 1992 NFL Defensive Rookie of the Year with the Tampa Bay Buccaneers as he registered 10 sacks and then played in two Super Bowls with the Green Bay Packers.

Santana Dotson is working to become an NFL broadcaster, and currently appears on the "Bob & Brian Show," on WHQG Radio in Milwaukee, during the NFL season.

There are several other prominent football players in the Dotson family. Alphonse Dotson, father of Santana played at Grambling University then went on to play for several teams in the NFL, ending with the Oakland Raiders.  Santana Dotson also has a nephew, Alonzo Dotson, who played for the Oklahoma Sooners, then was picked up as a free agent by the Washington Redskins, whom now in his 4th season with the New York Jets as a College Area Scout (South East) after spending 5 seasons with the Green Bay Packers as a area Scout.

References

External links
Santana Dotson Foundation

1969 births
Living people
All-American college football players
American football defensive tackles
Baylor Bears football players
Green Bay Packers players
Players of American football from New Orleans
Washington Redskins players
Tampa Bay Buccaneers players
Ed Block Courage Award recipients